Franklin Canyon Park is a public municipal park located near Benedict Canyon, at the eastern end of the Santa Monica Mountains, in Los Angeles, California. The park comprises 605 acres (245 ha), and is located near the geographical center of the city of Los Angeles. Franklin Canyon is also the name of the canyon and surrounding neighborhood.

The park features a 3-acre (1.2 ha) lake, a duck pond and over five miles (8 km) of hiking trails. The lake and pond are visited by birds in the Pacific Flyway.

The park is managed by the Mountains Recreation and Conservation Authority (MRCA), a partnership between the state-based Santa Monica Mountains Conservancy and the county-based Conejo Recreation and Park District and Rancho Simi Recreation and Park District, responsible for the parks those four organizations own or operate in the Los Angeles and Ventura counties.

The park has been used as a filming location for numerous television and film productions, including the hitchhiking scene in the 1934 film It Happened One Night and for the opening credits of The Andy Griffith Show.

History 

The park traces its beginnings to 1914 when William Mulholland and the Los Angeles Department of Water and Power built a reservoir in upper Franklin Canyon. The canyon was used by the family of oil baron Edward L. Doheny as a summer retreat. The 1930s began the frequent use of the canyon for filming.  Claudette Colbert's famous hitchhiking scene from It Happened One Night was filmed in 1935. Today about 25 films are shot here annually. During the 1970s the canyon was spared from development through the efforts of conservationist Sooky Goldman and Congressman Howard Berman, which resulted in the creation of the park.

Neighborhood 

The Franklin Canyon neighborhood lies south of Mulholland Drive and extends south almost to the city limits of Beverly Hills. It contains about 700 single-family homes. It is represented by the North Beverly Drive/Franklin Canyon Homeowners Association, a member of the Bel Air–Beverly Crest Neighborhood Council.

Flora and fauna 

Franklin Canyon is rich in plant life. Chaparral, shady grassland meadows and oak woodlands are found in the park. Also within the park's boundaries are sycamore, redwood and walnut trees, along with non-native pine and cedar. A vast array of wildflowers grow here.

The park is home to a variety of indigenous wildlife such as frogs, rabbits, squirrels, rats, mice, snakes, cougars, gray foxes, coyotes, and bobcats. Known as a bird watcher's delight, great horned owls, as many as seven species of hawk can be found here, and even eagles. And of course there are the ducks, including Mandarins and Wood ducks. Franklin Canyon is part of the Pacific Flyway and as a result the resident bird species often share company with neo-tropical migrants and other transient species, such as Canada geese.

Activities 
Popular activities are hiking, cycling, picnicking and bird watching. Park staff lead regularly scheduled hikes. In spite of the famous lake, swimming and fishing are not permitted. The park conducts natural history programs at the Sooky Goldman Nature Center, and the William O. Douglas Outdoor Classroom.

Located directly adjacent to Franklin Park is the headquarters of the conservation organization TreePeople. TreePeople also offers organized hikes, as well as tree care workshops and themed festivals.

Stop sign cameras 
In July, 2007, the Mountains Recreation and Conservation Authority installed three stop sign cameras in the park. The cameras photograph on average 17 motorists per day. The cost of the citation is $175. A spokeswoman for MRCA said, "We have seen a significant reduction in the number of people running stop signs." Former Beverly Hills city attorney Jack Allen opposes the cameras. He decried the alleged safety issue saying, "They're not speeding through there." In September 2010 a class action lawsuit was filed against the MRCA. The chief staff legal counsel of MRCA said in 2015 that the camera and ticketing program generates $1.5 million in revenue annually and costs the agency about $780,000.  Cameras are also installed at Temescal Canyon Park, Marvin Braude Mulholland Gateway Park, and Topanga State Park. MRCA issues roughly 24,000 traffic citations each year for various violations.

Gallery

In the media 
This is a partial list of media which have used Franklin Canyon Park:

Film 

 Private Lives (1931)
 It Happened One Night (1934) - Claudette Colbert's famous hitch-hiking scene, rural roads were filmed here
 These Three (1936)
 The Lady Escapes (1937)
 I Met My Love Again (1938)
 Four Men and a Prayer (1938)
 A Ducking They Did Go (1939)
 Creature from the Black Lagoon (1954) - the lagoon is Franklin Lake.
 The Manchurian Candidate (1962)
 The Man (1972)
 Bittersweet Love (1976)
 On Golden Pond (1981) - the eponymous pond
 A Nightmare on Elm Street (1984)
 Purple Rain (1984)
 Rambo: First Blood Part II (1985)
 Platoon (1986)
 The Great Outdoors (1988)
 Kindergarten Cop (1990)
 The Silence of the Lambs (1991)
 Camp Nowhere (1992)
 Sleepwalkers (1992)
 Drowning Mona (2000)
 Big Momma's House (2000)
 Dr. Dolittle 2 (2001)
 Minority Report (2002)
 Win a Date with Tad Hamilton! (2004)
 When a Stranger Calls (2006)
 Georgia Rule (2007)
 All About Steve (2007)
 National Treasure: Book of Secrets (2007)
 I Love You, Beth Cooper (2008)

Television 

 According To Jim
 American Horror Story: 1984
 The Andy Griffith Show - opening credits fishing hole, Myers Lake, is Franklin Lake
 B. J. and the Bear
 Bonanza
 The Brady Bunch
 Camp Runamuck
 Combat!
 Criminal Minds
 CSI: NY
 Doogie Howser, M.D.
 Dynasty
 ER
 Falcon Crest
 Green Acres - S3E15 "No Trespassing"
 How I Met Your Mother
 JAG
 How the West Was Won
 Hunter
 Lassie
 Mannix - S3E2 "Color Her Missing"
 Matlock
 Murder She Wrote
 NCIS
 Quantum Leap
 Salem's Lot
 Salute Your Shorts
 Santa Barbara
 Sons Of Anarchy
 Star Trek - some alien landscapes, including "The Paradise Syndrome"
 That Girl
 True Blood
 Twin Peaks
 The Fugitive - S1E14 "The Girl from Little Egypt"
 The Waltons - S4E25 "The Collision"
 Will And Grace
 The Young and the Restless

Music 
The park was used by photographer Guy Webster as a background for the following album covers:

 Sounds of Silence, Simon & Garfunkel
 Big Hits (High Tide and Green Grass), The Rolling Stones

See also 

Santa Monica Mountains National Recreation Area
Santa Monica Mountains

References

External links 
  Franklin Canyon Park at LAMountains.com, official site
 Franklin Canyon at IMDb
 TreePeople, official site
 "Franklin Canyon in Beverly Hills", by Pineapple.LA, video about the park (unofficial)
 Blog post with numerous photographs, parts I and II (obviously unofficial).

Parks in Beverly Hills, California
Nature centers in California
Santa Monica Mountains
Regional parks in California
Beverly Crest, Los Angeles
Articles containing video clips
Protected areas established in 1981
1981 establishments in California